During the 2002–03 Italian football season, Brescia competed in the Serie A.

Kit
Brescia's kit was manufactured by British sports retailer Umbro and sponsored by Banca Lombarda.

Squad

Transfers

Winter

Competitions

Serie A

League table

Results by round

Matches

Statistics

Players statistics

References

Brescia Calcio seasons
Brescia